The Chinese Ambassador to Iraq is the official representative of the People's Republic of China to the Republic of Iraq.

List of representatives

References 

Ambassadors of China to Iraq
Iraq
China